John Dimond (May 9, 1892 – September 15, 1968) was an American épée and foil fencer. He competed in three events at the 1920 Summer Olympics.

References

External links
 

1892 births
1968 deaths
American male sabre fencers
Olympic fencers of the United States
Fencers at the 1920 Summer Olympics
Sportspeople from New York City
American male épée fencers